Dalzielia is a species of plants in the Apocynaceae first described as a genus in 1922. It contains only one known species, Dalzielia oblanceolata, native to tropical West Africa.

References

Flora of West Tropical Africa
Asclepiadoideae
Monotypic Apocynaceae genera